With the ascension of Queen Anne to the throne of England these would be the first vessels associated to her reign. The vessels would be similar to the previous 1694 programme with one exception. The upper deck battery would be fully enclosed with a deck running from the foc'x'le to the quarterdeck. This would protect the gunners and battery during an action with the enemy. In 1702 one vessel was ordered from dockyard. In 1703 two more were ordered from dockyard.

Design and Specifications
Their dimensions would be very similar to the 1664 programme group for 32-gun vessels. Her builder’s measure tonnage was calculated as 400 tons (burthen). Tartar would be rebuilt to the 1719 establishment for 20-gun vessels. The tonnage calculation would be 374{ tons (bm).

Their crew would be 145 personnel during wartime with 100 personnel required for peacetime. Their guns were established at four/four demi-culverins on the lower deck, twenty-two/twenty 6-pounder guns on the upper deck and six/four 4-pounder guns on the quarterdeck. Later during their service the demi-culverins would be changed out for 12-pounder guns. In 1714 the four pounders would be removed. When the surviving ships were rebuilt as sixth rates in 1720 they would carry only twenty 6-pounder guns on the upper deck.

Notes

Citations

References

 Winfield (2009), British Warships in the Age of Sail (1603 – 1714), by Rif Winfield, published by Seaforth Publishing, England © 2009, EPUB 
 Winfield (2007), British Warships in the Age of Sail (1714 – 1792), by Rif Winfield, published by Seaforth Publishing, England © 2007, EPUB 
 Colledge (2020), Ships of the Royal Navy, by J.J. Colledge, revised and updated by Lt Cdr Ben Warlow and Steve Bush, published by Seaforth Publishing, Barnsley, Great Britain, © 2020, EPUB 
 Lavery (1989), The Arming and Fitting of English Ships of War 1600 - 1815, by Brian Lavery, published by US Naval Institute Press © Brian Lavery 1989, Part V Guns, Type of Guns
 Clowes (1898), The Royal Navy, A History from the Earliest Times to the Present (Vol. II). London. England: Sampson Low, Marston & Company, © 1898
 Clowes (1898), The Royal Navy, A History from the Earliest Times to the Present (Vol. III). London. England: Sampson Low, Marston & Company, © 1898

 

Frigates of the Royal Navy
Ships of the Royal Navy